Bobby "The Truth" Hoffman (born October 28, 1966) is a retired American mixed martial artist who competed in the heavyweight division. He is the former King of the Cage super heavyweight champion as well as the former King of the Cage heavyweight champion. Having made his professional debut in 1998, Hoffman has also formerly competed for the UFC, RINGS, and Jungle Fight. During his career, Hoffman defeated world champions Alistair Overeem and Ricco Rodriguez.



Background
Hoffman found mixed martial arts, then known as "shootfighting", after being released from jail, spending 92 consecutive days in solitary confinement for assault charges. Hoffman, a talented wrestler and football player, attended Ellsworth Community College and the University of Akron before leaving college a year early to compete in the NFL for the Cleveland Browns. Hoffman spent half of a season with the team before being released. Two days out of jail, Hoffman attended a local fight and after the originally scheduled fighter did not show up, spectators were asked if they wanted to step in for the absent fighter. Hoffman accepted the challenge, and won the bout.

Mixed martial arts

Early career
Hoffman compiled a professional record of 8-1 before making his debut for the SuperBrawl organization in Hawaii on September 7, 1999. After knocking out future UFC heavyweight champion, Ricco Rodriguez and defeating future Pride Heavyweight Championship contender, Heath Herring, via unanimous decision, Hoffman lost to future UFC heavyweight champion Josh Barnett by unanimous decision. Hoffman had suffered a broken arm in the win over Herring, but ignored the doctor's advice and fought Barnett in the final.  After following this up with two more wins, Hoffman was invited to compete for the RINGS organization in Japan.

RINGS
Hoffman made his RINGS debut, which was also his overseas debut, on February 26, 2000 in Tokyo, Japan at the RINGS: King of Kings 1999 final. Hoffman faced Georgia Olympic freestyle wrestling competitor, Zaza Tkeshelashvili, whom Hoffman defeated via knockout only 34 seconds into the fight. After compiling two more wins, Hoffman fought future Dream heavyweight champion, Strikeforce heavyweight champion, and K-1 World Grand Prix champion, Alistair Overeem at RINGS: Millennium Combine 2. Hoffman won via knockout at 9:39 of the first round. After winning his next four fights, two of which in the RINGS organization, Hoffman was invited to compete for the UFC.

UFC
Hoffman made his UFC debut against former UFC heavyweight champion, Maurice Smith at UFC 27 on September 22, 2000. Hoffman, who seemed to lack cardio and conditioning, lost the bout via unanimous decision. Eight days later, Hoffman won the RINGS USA: Rising Stars Tournament and then had two more fights with the Japan-based organization before returning to the UFC at UFC 30. Hoffman faced South African Mark Robinson and originally won the bout via knockout at 3:27 of the first round, but the decision was later changed to a no-contest as it was revealed that Hoffman failed a drug test for marijuana.

Hoffman went 5-0-1 in his next six fights with wins in the RINGS organization against Mikhail Ilyukhin and Ryushi Yanagisawa, and also became the King of the Cage super heavyweight champion on June 23, 2001, after defeating Kauai Kupihea via submission due to punches. Hoffman was later stripped of his title after leaving the promotion, with the win over Ilyukhin being his next fight. After returning to King of the Cage and defeating wrestling star Tim Catalfo via submission due to punches, Hoffman returned to fight for the UFC at UFC 34 against Josh Barnett, who had defeated Hoffman earlier in his career via unanimous decision. Hoffman lost the bout via TKO at 4:25 of the second round in what was the first TKO/KO loss of his career. Both Hoffman and Barnett failed drug tests for the fight, Hoffman for marijuana, as he admittedly smoked it only hours before the fight, and Barnett for multiple banned substances. This would be Hoffman's last fight for the organization and Barnett would become the new UFC heavyweight champion before having his title stripped for another failed drug test.

Post-UFC
After spending over a year in prison for domestic abuse, Hoffman returned to mixed martial arts competition for the King of the Cage organization. Hoffman became the first King of the Cage heavyweight champion in his second fight back after a TKO win over Jason Godsey and then defended his title against Paul Buentello via unanimous decision. Hoffman then lost a rematch with Buentello, also losing his title, but would bounce back with two wins before being handed his next loss against Carlos Barreto in Hoffman's debut for the Jungle Fight organization in Brazil at Jungle Fight 2. Hoffman fought again for King of the Cage, against veteran Ruben "Warpath" Villareal, and won via armbar submission before returning to Brazil for a bout in Jungle Fight 3, which he lost via triangle-choke submission.

Hoffman lost a rematch with Eric Pele via TKO before facing Tony Bonello in Australia. After the first bout ended in a no-contest, the two had a rematch two months later again in Bonello's home-country of Australia which Bonello won via submission due to punches. Hoffman then bounced back with a win via triangle-choke submission a month later, before winning his last mixed martial arts fight via TKO only eight seconds into the first round.

Personal life
Hoffman was dropped by manager Monte Cox after reportedly threatening to kill Cox's wife and children while Hoffman was fighting in Japan.

Hoffman and his girlfriend, Patricia, wed the night after Hoffman's UFC 34 loss to Barnett. Weeks later on the night of their honeymoon, Hoffman, under the influence of alcohol and Vicodin, severely beat his wife. He was later arrested and spent over a year in a maximum-security prison in Shafter, California, for his actions. His wife, who was only 20 years old at the time and around 125 pounds, almost died as a result of her injuries and the two later divorced.

Championships and accomplishments
Fighting Network RINGS
2000 Rising Stars Heavyweight Tournament winner
2001 RINGS Openweight Championship Tournament runner-up
Icon Sport
SuperBrawl 13 Heavyweight Tournament runner-up
King of the Cage
KOTC Super Heavyweight Championship (1 time)
KOTC Heavyweight Championship (1 time, first)
One successful title defense

Mixed martial arts record

|-
| Win
| align=center| 36–10–1 (2)
| Chuck Grigsby
| TKO (punches)
| Mainstream MMA: Inferno
| 
| align=center| 1
| align=center| 1:47
| Cedar Rapids, Iowa, United States
| 
|-
| Win
| align=center| 35–10–1 (2)
| Paul O'Keefe
| Submission (arm-triangle choke)
| KOTC: Predator
| 
| align=center| 1
| align=center| 1:29
| Globe, Arizona, United States
| 
|-
| Loss
| align=center|  (2)
| Tony Bonello
| TKO (submission to punches)
| KOTC: Unfinished Business
| 
| align=center| 1
| align=center| 1:48
| Sydney, Australia
| 
|-
| NC
| align=center| 34–9–1 (2)
| Tony Bonello
| NC (overturned)
| KOTC: Gunfather
| 
| align=center| 1
| align=center| 2:28
| Australia
| 
|-
| Loss
| align=center| 34–9–1 (1)
| Eric Pele
| TKO (punches)
| KOTC: Mortal Sins
| 
| align=center| 2
| align=center| 2:55
| Primm, Nevada, United States
| 
|-
| Loss
| align=center| 34–8–1 (1)
| Leopoldo Montenegro
| Submission (triangle choke)
| Jungle Fight 3
| 
| align=center| 1
| align=center| 2:59
| Manaus, Brazil
| 
|-
| Win
| align=center| 34–7–1 (1)
| Ruben Villareal
| Submission (armbar)
| KOTC 39: Hitmaster
| 
| align=center| 1
| align=center| 4:02
| San Jacinto, California, United States
| 
|-
| Loss
| align=center| 33–7–1 (1)
| Carlos Barreto
| TKO (submission to punches)
| Jungle Fight 2
| 
| align=center| 2
| align=center| N/A
| Manaus, Brazil
| 
|-
| Win
| align=center| 33–6–1 (1)
| Mike Wolmack
| KO (knee)
| GC 25: Gladiator Challenge 25
| 
| align=center| 1
| align=center| 1:00
| Porterville, California, United States
| 
|-
| Win
| align=center| 32–6–1 (1)
| Ladislav Zak
| Decision (split)
| 2H2H: 2 Hot 2 Handle
| 
| align=center| 3
| align=center| 5:00
| Amsterdam, Netherlands
| 
|-
| Loss
| align=center| 31–6–1 (1)
| Paul Buentello
| Submission (verbal)
| KOTC 30: The Pinnacle
| 
| align=center| 2
| align=center| N/A
| San Jacinto, California, United States
|
|-
| Win
| align=center| 31–5–1 (1)
| Paul Buentello
| Decision (unanimous)
| KOTC 27: Aftermath
| 
| align=center| 3
| align=center| 5:00
| San Jacinto, California, United States
|
|-
| Win
| align=center| 30–5–1 (1)
| Jason Godsey
| TKO (punches)
| rowspan=2|KOTC 21: Invasion
| rowspan=2|
| align=center| 1
| align=center| 1:56
| rowspan=2|Albuquerque, New Mexico, United States
|
|-
| Win
| align=center| 29–5–1 (1)
| Sam Sotello
| TKO (injury)
| align=center| 2
| align=center| 0:23
| 
|-
| Loss
| align=center| 28–5–1 (1)
| Josh Barnett
| TKO (punches)
| UFC 34
| 
| align=center| 2
| align=center| 4:25
| Las Vegas, Nevada, United States
| 
|-
| Win
| align=center| 28–4–1 (1)
| Tim Catalfo
| TKO (submission to strikes)
| KOTC 11: Domination
| 
| align=center| 1
| align=center| 3:56
| San Jacinto, California, United States
| 
|-
| Win
| align=center| 27–4–1 (1)
| Mikhail Ilyukhin
| TKO (corner stoppage)
| Rings: 10th Anniversary
| 
| align=center| 2
| align=center| 5:00
| Tokyo, Japan
| 
|-
| Win
| align=center| 26–4–1 (1)
| Kauai Kupihea
| TKO (submission to punches)
| KOTC 9: Showtime
| 
| align=center| 2
| align=center| 4:00
| San Jacinto, California, United States
|
|-
| Draw
| align=center| 25–4–1 (1)
| Bob Schrijber
| Draw
| RINGS Holland: No Guts, No Glory
| 
| align=center| 2
| align=center| 5:00
| Amsterdam, Netherlands
| 
|-
| Win
| align=center| 25–4 (1)
| Ryushi Yanagisawa
| Decision (unanimous)
| RINGS: World Title Series 1
| 
| align=center| 2
| align=center| 5:00
| Tokyo, Japan
| 
|-
| Win
| align=center| 24–4 (1)
| Zane Frazier
| Submission (armbar)
| RINGS USA: Battle of Champions
| 
| align=center| 1
| align=center| 1:34
| Council Bluffs, Iowa, United States
| 
|-
| NC
| align=center| 23–4 (1)
| Mark Robinson
| NC (overturned)
| UFC 30
| 
| align=center| 1
| align=center| 3:27
| Atlantic City, New Jersey, United States
| 
|-
| Loss
| align=center| 23–4
| Magomedkhan Gamzatkhanov
| Decision (unanimous)
| rowspan=2|Rings: King of Kings 2000 Block B
| rowspan=2|
| align=center| 3
| align=center| 5:00
| rowspan=2|Osaka, Japan
| 
|-
| Win
| align=center| 23–3
| Joop Kasteel
| KO (punches)
| align=center| 1
| align=center| 0:43
| 
|-
| Win
| align=center| 22–3
| Aaron Brink
| TKO (submission to punches)
| rowspan=2|Rings USA: Rising Stars Final
| rowspan=2|
| align=center| 1
| align=center| 1:34
| rowspan=2|Moline, Illinois, United States
| 
|-
| Win
| align=center| 21–3
| Eric Pele
| Decision (unanimous)
| align=center| 3
| align=center| 5:00
| 
|-
| Loss
| align=center| 20–3
| Maurice Smith
| Decision (majority)
| UFC 27
| 
| align=center| 3
| align=center| 5:00
| New Orleans, Louisiana, United States
| 
|-
| Win
| align=center| 20–2
| Greg Wikan
| TKO (knees)
| EC 36: Extreme Challenge 36
| 
| align=center| 1
| align=center| 3:43
| Davenport, Iowa, United States
| 
|-
| Win
| align=center| 19–2
| Aaron Brink
| Submission (neck crank)
| rowspan=2|Rings USA: Rising Stars Block A
| rowspan=2|
| align=center| 1
| align=center| 3:12
| rowspan=2|Orem, Utah, United States
| 
|-
| Win
| align=center| 18–2
| Victor Burtsev
| TKO (punches)
| align=center| 1
| align=center| 3:13
| 
|-
| Win
| align=center| 17–2
| Sam Adkins
| TKO (doctor stoppage)
| Extreme Challenge 35
| 
| align=center| 1
| align=center| 2:25
| Davenport, Iowa, United States
| 
|-
| Win
| align=center| 16–2
| Alistair Overeem
| KO (punch)
| Rings: Millennium Combine 2
| 
| align=center| 1
| align=center| 9:39
| Tokyo, Japan
| 
|-
| Win
| align=center| 15–2
| Kerry Schall
| Decision (unanimous)
| WEF 9: World Class
| 
| align=center| 4
| align=center| 3:00
| Evansville, Indiana, United States
| 
|-
| Win
| align=center| 14–2
| Borislav Jeliazkov
| KO (punch)
| Rings: Millennium Combine 1
| 
| align=center| 1
| align=center| 8:00
| Tokyo, Japan
| 
|-
| Win
| align=center| 13–2
| Zaza Tkeshelashvili
| KO (punch)
| Rings: King of Kings 1999 Final
| 
| align=center| 1
| align=center| 0:34
| Tokyo, Japan
| 
|-
| Win
| align=center| 12–2
| Alex Paz
| TKO (submission to punches)
| WEF 8: Goin' Platinum
| 
| align=center| 2
| align=center| 1:39
| Rome, Georgia, United States
| 
|-
| Win
| align=center| 11–2
| Paul Wells
| TKO 
| CC 5: Cage Combat 5
| 
| align=center| 1
| align=center| 12:51
| Burlington, Iowa, United States
| 
|-
| Loss
| align=center| 10–2
| Josh Barnett
| Decision (unanimous)
| rowspan=3|SuperBrawl 13
| rowspan=3|
| align=center| 3
| align=center| 5:00
| rowspan=3|Honolulu, Hawaii, United States
| 
|-
| Win
| align=center| 10–1
| Heath Herring
| Decision (unanimous)
| align=center| 2
| align=center| 5:00
| 
|-
| Win
| align=center| 9–1
| Ricco Rodriguez
| KO (punches)
| align=center| 1
| align=center| 3:13
| 
|-
| Win
| align=center| 8–1
| Tommy Sauer
| Submission (guillotine choke)
| rowspan=2|Extreme Challenge 27
| rowspan=2|
| align=center| 1
| align=center| 4:46
| rowspan=2|Davenport, Iowa, United States
| 
|-
| Win
| align=center| 7–1
| Ahmad Ahmad
| TKO (punches)
| align=center| 1
| align=center| 1:14
| 
|-
| Win
| align=center| 6–1
| Theo Brooks
| TKO (exhaustion)
| Cage Combat 2
| 
| align=center| 1
| align=center| 7:47
| Ottumwa, Iowa, United States
| 
|-
| Win
| align=center| 5–1
| Rocky Batastini
| Decision (unanimous)
| rowspan=2|Extreme Challenge 24
| rowspan=2|
| align=center| 1
| align=center| 1:12
| rowspan=2|Salt Lake City, Utah, United States
| 
|-
| Win
| align=center| 4–1
| Joe Campenella
| Submission (keylock)
| align=center| 1
| align=center| 1:12
| 
|-
| Win
| align=center| 3–1
| Mark Tullius
| TKO (submission to punches)
| Extreme Challenge 20
| 
| align=center| 1
| align=center| 11:55
| Davenport, Iowa, United States
| 
|-
| Win
| align=center| 2–1
| Brad Jones
| TKO (referee stoppage)
| Extreme Challenge 16
| 
| align=center| 1
| align=center| 7:22
| Council Bluffs, Iowa, United States
| 
|-
| Loss
| align=center| 1–1
| Mike Delaney
| Decision
| rowspan=2|RnB 2: Bare Knuckle Brawl
| rowspan=2|
| align=center| 1
| align=center| 15:00
| rowspan=2|Atlanta, Georgia, United States
| 
|-
| Win
| align=center| 1–0
| Rick Graveson
| TKO (submission to punches)
| align=center| 1
| align=center| 3:00
|

References

External links

 

1966 births
Living people
American male mixed martial artists
Mixed martial artists from Iowa
Heavyweight mixed martial artists
Mixed martial artists utilizing wrestling
Ultimate Fighting Championship male fighters
People from Centerville, Iowa